NGC 1714 is an emission nebula in the constellation of Dorado. It is located in the Large Magellanic Cloud and was discovered by John Herschel on 2 November 1834. A study investigating the chemical composition of HII regions in the Large Magellanic Cloud was conducted in it, finding a larger deuterium density than previously thought, leading to (with current knowledge) larger than accepted age of the universe. Candidates for planetary nebula have also been found in the vicinity of NGC 1714.

References 
 Q938880. (2019, February 28). Wikidata. Retrieved 11:38, March 16, 2019 from https://www.wikidata.org/w/index.php?title=Q938880&oldid=869778701. 

Dorado (constellation)
1714
Emission nebulae
Astronomical objects discovered in 1834
Discoveries by John Herschel
Large Magellanic Cloud